Deepa Sashindran (born 3 July 1974) is an Indian artist and a disciple of the Kuchipudi expert Smt. Manju Bhargavi. She is a performing artist, teacher of the Indian classical dance form Kuchipudi, choreographer, art curator, entrepreneur, and the founder of Kuchipudi Parampara Foundation Trust Bangalore.

Early life and education
Sashindran started the classical dance form of Bharatanatyam at the age of 5 under the Gurus Kalamandalam Usha Datar and Dr. Savithri Ramaiah. From the age of 8, she started learning the Kuchipudi form of dance under the renowned Kuchipudi expert Smt. Manju Bhargavi and continued studying under her for three decades. She also trained with Guru Vempati Ravi Shankar on new innovations. Currently, Sashindran is creating finer nuances of the art-form with the Kuchipudi Parampara Foundation Trust, which she established in Bangalore.

Career
Sashindran is a versatile artist of the Kuchipudi dance style who has practiced the art-form for close to four decades. She has received many accolades for her vivacious dance techniques and spellbound solo performances. She has also had lead roles in dance dramas and performed alongside her Guru on many prestigious festivals and occasions. The government of Karnataka's Kuchipudi textbook committee has incorporated her dance pictures into the Kuchipudi text book of that state.

The First International Kuchipudi Dance Conference of North America, which was held in Houston and organized by Samskriti, invited Sashindran to render solo performances. She has conducted workshops and performances at Doha, Dubai, and Abu Dhabi. The Festival of India at Bahrain, organized by the Ministry of Culture, invited an ensemble led by Sashindran to perform.

Sashindran has carved a niche for herself with original choreographic works that include numerous authentic solo repertoires, as well as features and dance dramas such as Shivaleela, Dakshayagnam, Jayadeva Dashavatharam, Agnijyotsna, PanchaNayikas, Sri Venkatadri Vaibhavam (Annamacharya TTD Project), Nadhi, Nandanar Charitam, and so forth. She teaches students In India, Europe, USA, Australia, South Korea, the UAE, and South Africa.

Sashindran has also helped organize innovative dance festivals such as NatyaVedam, Natya Parampara Utsav, Guru Vandana, and the Art Cafe series. She has helped organize workshops, lectures, and demonstrations.

She has received many awards such as the Best Kuchipudi Artiste of Karnataka from Yuvaranga, the Nritya Shiromani National Award at Cuttack, and the Sathyabhama Award from Kuchipudi danseuse Padmasri -Sobha Naidu at Visakhapatnam. Garden University honored her with the International Women Achievers Award, and she has also been honored by the Philanthropic Society of India and Nanma Kerala. She is an accredited artist of Doordarshan, an empaneled artist of the Festivals of India Abroad, a co-opted member of Karnataka NrithyakalaParishath, an interim faculty member at Alliance University, and an examiner at Reva University.

Aside from dance, Sashindran is a law graduate with a PGD in industrial relations and personal management, a human resources specialist in the software industry, and an entrepreneur in Human Capital Management Services. She founded the company Karma Kreators which has successfully engaged with well-known startups and mid-sized companies like Pricewaterhouse Coopers, Samsung, MISys, Subex, Sasken, and others. She has also taken up social responsibilities as an Rotarian.

Kuchipudi Parampara Foundation
The Kuchipudi Parampara Foundation, founded by Deepa Sashindran, is a non-profit trust intended to propagate and promote the Kuchipudi form of classical dance. The Foundation offers systematic training, including master classes in Bangalore and Calicut to cultivate artists of high caliber. The activities of the foundation include not only classes, workshops, performances, productions, and festivals but also other endeavors for the propagation of the art form devised by its professionally run advisory committee.

The foundation now also holds master classes at Sri Kaithapram Damodaran Namboothiri’s Swathi Kala Kendram at Calicut, Kerala. Many veteran artists of Bangalore have attended.

In 2014, the Kuchipudi Parampara Foundation held their first "Divinity in Kuchipudi" festival entitled Natya Parampara Utsav. The festival included eminent Kuchipudi artists such as the senior Guru of Kuchipudi Village.

The Foundation produced the inaugural dance drama presentation "Agnijyotsna" about Queen Draupadi. It received rave reviews for its conception, lyrics, music, choreography, and presentation. This production also paved the way for new character innovation without deviating from the purity of the dance form.

The youngest member of the academy, the child prodigy Lakshmika, was featured on the editorial page of the latest 2014 attendance book "Telugu Traditions". This book was written in part by Ashish Mohan Khokar and guest edited by Padmasri Ananda Shankar Jayant.

Dance festivals

Natya Vedam Annual Dance Festival - 2012
Deepa Sashindran organized the Natya Vedam Annual Dance Festival 2012 on 18 and 19 May as a tribute to her Dance Guru, Manju Barggavee. The event was held in Bangalore and featured eminent artists of classical and contemporary dance forms.

Natya Parampara Utsav - 2014 till date
The foundation has organized Natya Parampara Utsav for the promotion of the arts. For example, the event "Divinity in Kuchipudi" was held on 24–25 May 2014 at Bhartiya Vidya Bhavan, Bangalore and featured eminent artists of the Kuchipudi dance forms.

Awards and Credentials 
Best Kuchipudi Artiste Yuva Ranga
Nritya Shiromani National Award
Sathyabhama Excellence Award
Nrithya Vilasini
Natya Kousthuba
International Women Achievers of Bangalore award by Garden City University
Honored by the Philanthropic Society of India
Honored by Exide Life Insurance Company Ltd
 Best Institution Recognition by Rotary International

References

External links

 Review by The Hindu
 Review by Narthaki
 Review by Highbeam
 Kuchipudi Parampara Foundation

Performance videos:
 Video of Agnijyotsna by Deepa Sashindran
Udaya News Channel
Bala gopala Tarangam Kuchipudi
Brocheva keerthanam Kuchipudi
Ganesha Stuti
Guruvayur Temple festival
Devi Stuti Ranjani Niranjani Kuchipudi
Kamakshi Stuti

Performers of Indian classical dance
Kuchipudi exponents
Bharatanatyam exponents
Living people
Malayali people
Dancers from Karnataka
Indian classical choreographers
1974 births
Indian female classical dancers
Indian women choreographers
Indian choreographers
Bangalore University alumni
Women artists from Karnataka
20th-century Indian dancers
20th-century Indian women artists